The 1993 Clásica de San Sebastián was the 13th edition of the Clásica de San Sebastián cycle race and was held on 7 August 1993. The race started and finished in San Sebastián. The race was won by Claudio Chiappucci of the Carrera team.

General classification

References

Clásica de San Sebastián
San
Clasica De San Sebastian
August 1993 sports events in Europe